The bantamweight division in mixed martial arts refers to a number of different weight classes:

 The UFC's bantamweight division, which groups competitors within 126–135 lb (61.3 kg)
The King of the Cage bantamweight class, with upper limit at 145 lb (65.8 kg)
 The Shooto bantamweight division, which suits competitors below 125 lb (56.7 kg)
 The ONE Championship's bantamweight division, with upper limit at 
 The Road FC's bantamweight division, with upper limit at 135.6 lb (61.5 kg)

The bantamweight division sits between the lighter flyweight (116–125 lb) division and the heavier featherweight division (136–145 lb).

Ambiguity and clarification
For the sake of uniformity, many American mixed martial arts websites refer to competitors between 126 and 135 lb (57 and 61 kg) as bantamweights, as it encompasses both the Shooto Featherweight division (132 lb / 60 kg) and the King of the Cage Flyweight division (135 lb / 61 kg). The Association of Boxing Commissions, which governs MMA in the United States, uses the 126-135 standard for "bantamweight".

Prior to UFC 31, 150-pound (68 kg) fighters were known as bantamweights in the Ultimate Fighting Championship, after which the weight limit was raised to 155 lb (70 kg), and the division was reinstated as the lightweight class.

The bantamweight limit, as defined by the Nevada State Athletic Commission and the Association of Boxing Commissions is 135 lb (61.36 kg).

Professional champions

Current champions
These tables were last updated in July 2022.

Men:

Women:

See also
List of current MMA Bantamweight Champions
List of current MMA Women's Bantamweight Champions
List of UFC Bantamweight Champions
List of WEC Bantamweight Champions (defunct)
List of Pancrase Bantamweight Champions
List of Road FC Bantamweight Champions

References

External links

 
Mixed martial arts weight classes